The All India Carrom Federation (AICF) is India's national sport federation for the indigenous game of carrom, sanctioning six to seven national-level tournaments per year. It is India's representative body in the International Carrom Federation. The AICF has 15 regional and 28 state subnational affiliate institutions, the largest of which is the Maharashtra Carrom Association, further subdivided into local organisations.

As of 2007, the federation's president is Rakibul Hussain and its general secretary is Bharti Narayan. Recent national champions include R. M. Shankra, Ravinder Goud and A. Maria Irudayam.

History
The state associations as its member. Shri C. Cunnaiah of Tamil Nadu was the General Secretary and Shri Hedvekar of Maharashtra was elected as its President. It got itself registered under the Societies Registration Act XXI of 1860 at Madras on 7 July 1977. The Federation was recognized by the Sports Council of India on 26 October 1970. It became the member of the International Carrom Federation on 15 October 1988 and played a pivotal role in the formation of the International Federation. In 1991, the Government of India included the game of carrom in its list for the purpose of recruitment under sports quota in Government offices/ organizations. The Asian Carrom Confederation became affiliated with the AICF in September 1995.

The All-India Carrom Federation and the game of carrom was recognized by the Indian Olympic Association on 26 October 1997. The game of carrom was also recognized by the School Games Federation of India in 1996.

The organisation at present has 31 Indian state/UT associations and 15 Institutions as its affiliates. The Working Committee of the Federation is elected for a term of four years. The last elections to the Federation were held in August 2003 at Goa. AICF regularly conducts national championships for sub-junior, junior, and senior (older adult) divisions. It also conducts institutional national championships., the All-India Federation Cup, and various other all-India ranking and prize-money tournaments every year. It has so far conducted 96 national championships for sub-junior, junior and senior players, and has introduced  cadet (under 12 years of age) and youth (under 21 years of age) national championships.

The Federation has also made bilateral arrangements with various countries for organizing "Test Series" competitions. India and Sri Lanka are playing Test Series on regular basis. The Federation hosted two World Championships in Delhi: the 1st World Carrom Championship in 1991 and the 3rd World Carrom Championship in 2000.

Officials
 President: Rakibul Hussain, Minister for Panchyat, Rural Development and Forests & Environment, Government of Assam
 Executive President: S.K. Sharma
 Vice-Presidents: P. K. Hazarika (Assam), Bharat bhushan (Bihar), B. K. Harnath (Hyderabad), M. Shekhri (Chandigarh), S. P. Verekar (Goa)
 Assistant Vice-Presidents: D. B. Gupta, Ratan Singh, Ashok Mittal, Rajiv Shrivastav, Vijay Tulpule
 General Secretary: P.S. Bachher (Vidarbha Carrom Association)
 Asstistant General Secretary: P. Raveendran (Kerala)
 Treasurer: P Raveendran (Kerala State Carrom Association)
 Joint Secretaries: North Zone – Gurinder Singh (Punjab); South Zone – S. Uday Kumar (Pondicherry); West Zone – Kunja Phanse (Gujarat); North East – Rupak Debroy (Tripura), East Zone – Mukul Jha (Jharkhand)

All India Panel Umpires
 S. K. Abdul Jaleel, Andhra
 S.K. Ajmatullah, Andhra
 K. Ramesh, Andhra
 T. Srinivasa Rao, Andhra
 D.S.R. Murthy, Andhra
 S.Madhusudanarao, Andhra
 Manoj Kumar Das, Assam
 Rana Sharma, Assam
 Mridul Talukdar, Assam 
 Prasanta Neog, Assam
 Pinto Mukherjee, Bengal
 Debabrata Ghoshal, Bengal
 Hussain Irshad, Bihar
 Rajneesh Sinha, Bihar
 Sanmir Verenkar, Goa
 Dinanath, Goa
 Ms. Nirmala Mahant, Gujarat
 Ms Kamna Yadav, Haryana
 J.S. Saroha, Haryana
 Shashwat, Haryana
 Zaheeruddin Khan, Hyderabad
 Srinivasa Rao, Hyderabad
 S. Shobhanraj, Hyderabad
 Karoda Singh, Hyderabad
 H. Shivaji Rao, Karnataka
 G. Jayakumar, Karnataka
 B. Rama, Karnataka
 B.C. Krishna Swamy, Karnataka
 Dutta Salagare, Maharashtra
 Shekhar S Chavan, Maharashtra
 Ramesh S Chavan, Maharashtra
 Ketan Chikale, Maharashtra
 Suhas Karbhari, Maharashtra
 Ashish Bagkar, Maharashtra
 S K Abdula, Orissa
 Probodh Patnaik, Orissa
 R. Srinivasan, Tamil Nadu
 G. Jayakumar, Tamil Nadu
 A.K. Asthana, U.P
 Ajay Kumar Sharma, U.P
 Mukund Nagpurkar, Maharashtra
 Ramteke, Maharashtra
 C. Senthamizh Kumaran, Puducherry
 I. Ilansezhiyan, Puducherry
 Arjun Kumar Yadav, Chandigarh

State/regional associations

North
 Punjab State Carrom Association
 Haryana Carrom Association
 Delhi Carrom Association
 Jammu & Kashmir Carrom Association
 Chandigarh Carrom Association
 Himachal Pradesh Carrom Association
 Uttaranchal Carrom Association

South
 Tamil Nadu Carrom Association
 Hyderabad Carrom Association
 Andhra Pradesh Carrom Association
 Karnataka Carrom Association
 Kerala Carrom Association.
 Puducherry Carrom Association
 Andaman & Nicobar Carrom Association
 Kakinada Carrom Association

West
 Rajasthan Carrom Association
 Maharashtra Carrom Association
 Vidharba Carrom Association
 Gujarat Carrom Association
 Goa Carrom Association
 My Carrom Association

East
 Carrom (29") Association of Bengal
 Odisha State Carrom Association
 Sikkim Carrom Association

Center
 Uttar Pradesh Carrom Association affiliated by AICF
 Bihar Carrom Association
 Chhattisgarh Carrom Association
 Jharkhand Carrom Association
 Madhya Pradesh Carrom Association

Institutional members
 Banks Sports Board
 Life Insurance Corporation of India Sports Board
 Reserve Bank of India sports board
 Petroleum Sports Promotion Board
 All India Electricity Sports Board
 BSNL Sports board & Cultural Board
 Central Civil Services Cultural & Sports Control Board
 Defense Accounts Sports Control Board
 Indian Accounts & Audit Dept. Sports Board
 Indian Medical Association Sports Board
 ISRO sports & Recreation Club
 Major Ports Sports Control Board
 Postal Sports Control Board
 United India Sports & Cultural Council

References

 https://web.archive.org/web/20070813125050/http://sportal.nic.in/index.asp%7B%7BClarify%7Cdate%3DFebruary 2008}}
 Punjab State Carrom Association
 Souvenir 2004, AICF, New Delhi

Carrom organisations
C
Carrom in India
Year of establishment missing
Organisations based in Delhi